George Herman Mahon (September 22, 1900 – November 19, 1985) was a Texas politician who served twenty-two consecutive terms (1935–1979) as a member of the United States House of Representatives from the Lubbock-based 19th congressional district. He was a member of the Democratic Party.

His legacies include the development of federal farm programs, the establishment of the former Reese Air Force Base in Lubbock and Webb Air Force Base in Big Spring, leadership in the development of Interstate 27, a short connection between Amarillo and Lubbock, and disaster relief during droughts and tornadoes common to West Texas.

Background

Mahon was born to John Kirkpatrick Mahon and the former Lola Willis in the Mahon community near Haynesville in Claiborne Parish in northern  Louisiana near the Arkansas state line. In 1908, Mahon's family moved to Loraine in Mitchell County, Texas, where young George graduated from Loraine High School. In 1924, he received his bachelor's degree from Baptist-affiliated Hardin-Simmons University in Abilene. He married the Helen Stevenson in 1923, and they had one daughter, Daphne. In 1925, Mahon graduated from the University of Texas Law School in Austin.

 
Mahon joined a friend, Charlie Thompson, in the opening of a law firm in Colorado City. He was elected county attorney for Mitchell County, Texas in 1926. Thereafter, Governor Dan Moody named Mahon district attorney of the thirty-second judicial district of Texas, a position which he held from 1927 to 1933, having been elected once after the initial gubernatorial appointment.

Congressional tenure

Mahon was first elected to the House of Representatives in 1934, when he defeated Clark Millican of Lubbock in the runoff election for the seat. Lubbock residents, including Charles A. Guy, the editor of the Lubbock Avalanche-Journal, urged that the seat go to a Lubbock resident – Millican – because Lubbock is the largest city in the district. Rural areas, however, coalesced behind Mahon. Once in office, Mahon cemented his hold on Lubbock as well as the whole district and rarely had opposition in his reelection campaigns. In its 2008 centennial, the Avalanche-Journal declared Mahon the most influential figure in Lubbock's 20th century history.

Mahon was a delegate to each Democratic National Convention from 1936 to 1964, having participating in the nomination of all party standard-bearers from Franklin D. Roosevelt to Lyndon B. Johnson. He was the chairman of the Appropriations Committee from 1964 until his retirement from the House in 1979. Known for his personal frugality, Mahon often clashed with presidents of both parties who he determined wanted to spend more money than the treasury could afford. Early in his Congressional tenure, Mahon served on the committee that developed the Manhattan Project.  In 1947-8, he served on the Herter Committee.

He was one of the majority of the Texan delegation to decline to sign the 1956 Southern Manifesto opposing the desegregation of public schools ordered by the Supreme Court in Brown v. Board of Education. However, Mahon voted against the Civil Rights Acts of 1957, 1960, 1964, and 1968, as well as the 24th Amendment to the U.S. Constitution and the Voting Rights Act of 1965.

On three occasions, 1962, 1964, and 1976, Mahon faced Republican opponents Dennis Taylor, Joe B. Phillips (1925-2012), a Realtor from Lubbock and later the administrator of the Smithlawn Church of Christ Maternity Home and Adoption Agency, and then Jim Reese, a former mayor of Odessa, respectively. Mahon topped Taylor, 46,925 (67.1 percent) to 23,022 (32.9 percent) in the same election in which the Republican Ed Foreman of Odessa unseated the Democrat J.T. Rutherford in an adjacent West Texas congressional district. Mahon prevailed in 1964, 87,555 (77.6 percent) to Phillips's 25,243 (22.4 percent).

In his last race, Mahon defeated Reese, 87,908 (54.6 percent) to 72,991 (45.4 percent), with victory secured by his large margin in Lubbock County.  Mahon decided not to run again for the U.S. House in 1978, when Reese lost the Republican runoff primary for the seat to George W. Bush, who was then defeated in the general election by Democrat Kent Hance, who subsequently switched parties.

After his years in the House, Mahon stayed in Washington to work with the Smithsonian Institution, of which he was a regent from 1964 to 1978.

Mahon died in San Angelo of complications from knee surgery. He is interred at the Loraine City Cemetery in Loraine in Mitchell County alongside Mrs. Mahon, who died in 1987.

References

External links

Mahon papers, 1887-1986 and undated, in the Southwest Collection/Special Collections Library at Texas Tech University

1900 births
1985 deaths
Hardin–Simmons University alumni
University of Texas School of Law alumni
County district attorneys in Texas
People from Lubbock, Texas
People from Claiborne Parish, Louisiana
People from Colorado City, Texas
Democratic Party members of the United States House of Representatives from Texas
20th-century American lawyers
20th-century American politicians
People from Loraine, Texas
Deans of the United States House of Representatives